Philip John May (20 September 1944 – 30 November 2014) was an Olympic athlete from Australia. He specialised in the triple jump and long jump events, and was a formidable relay runner in the 4 × 100.

May represented Australia at three Commonwealth Games and one Olympic Games, finishing sixth in the Triple Jump at the 1968 Olympic Games in Mexico City.

Between 1965 and 1973 May won ten Australian Championships in two field events, namely triple jump (six) and long jump (four).

World rankings
Phil was ranked in the Top 10 in the World for four consecutive years by the prestigious Track & Field News magazine.

{| class="wikitable"
|-
!  Year
!  Event
!  Ranked
|-
|  1968 ||  Triple Jump  || 6th 
|-
|  1969 ||  Triple Jump  || 6th 
|-
|  1970 ||  Triple Jump  || 5th 
|-
|  1970 ||   Long Jump   || 6th 
|-
|  1971 ||  Triple Jump  || 10th
|}

Post-playing career
May is the co-founder of Dôme café chain.

References

 Sports-reference
 Profile

1944 births
2014 deaths
Athletes (track and field) at the 1966 British Empire and Commonwealth Games
Athletes (track and field) at the 1968 Summer Olympics
Athletes (track and field) at the 1970 British Commonwealth Games
Athletes (track and field) at the 1974 British Commonwealth Games
Australian male long jumpers
Australian male triple jumpers
Olympic athletes of Australia
Commonwealth Games gold medallists for Australia
Commonwealth Games medallists in athletics
Australian businesspeople
Medallists at the 1970 British Commonwealth Games